Major General Ingvar Oskar Daniel Berg (10 October 1905 – 2 July 1993) was a Swedish Air Force officer and modern pentathlete who finished fourth at the 1928 Summer Olympics.

Early life
Berg was born on 10 October 1905 in Stockholm, Sweden, the son of major Rudolf Berg and his wife Ingrid Westermark. Berg passed studentexamen in Karlstad in 1924.

Career
Berg was commissioned as an officer in Svea Artillery Regiment in 1926 with the rank of Fänrik. He attended the higher course at the Artillery and Engineering College from 1930 to 1932 and conducted special studies at the Royal Institute of Technology from 1933 to 1934. Berg then transferred to the newly created Swedish Air Force where he became in lieutenant in 1936. He was promoted to captain in 1937 and served as a teacher at the Artillery and Engineering College from 1938 to 1940. Promoted to major in 1942, Berg then served as a teacher at the Royal Swedish Air Force Staff College from 1943 to 1944 and as commanding officer of the Swedish Air Force Squadron Leader School (Flygvapnets bomb- och skjutskola). He was promoted to lieutenant colonel in 1944.

In 1945, Berg was appointed commanding officer of Skaraborg Wing from 1945 to 1950. He was promoted to colonel in 1947 and served as commanding officer of Västmanland Wing from 1950 to 1954 and of the Fourth Air Group (Fjärde flygeskadern, E 4) from 1954 to 1957. In 1957, Berg was appointed commanding officer of the Second Air Group (Andra flygeskadern, E 2) and the year after he was promoted to major general. He left the position in 1966 and then from 1966 to 1967, Berg headed the Swedish contingent at the Neutral Nations Supervisory Commission (NNSC) in Korea. Berg retired from the military in 1967 and then headed the Flygvapnets personaldelegation ("Swedish Air Force Personnel Delegation") from 1967 to 1974.

Personal life
In 1933, Berg married Ulla Frydén (born 1907), the daughter of lieutenant colonel Einar Frydén and Gertrud Heyman. They had three children: Ingrid (born 1938), Sven (born 1940) and Eva (born 1944).

Dates of rank

Army
1926 – Second lieutenant
1928 – Underlöjtnant
1931 – Lieutenant

Air Force
1936 – Lieutenant
1937 – Captain
1942 – Major
1944 – Lieutenant colonel
1947 – Colonel
1958 – Major general

Awards and decorations

Swedish
   Commander 1st Class of the Order of the Sword (18 November 1954)
   Knight of the Order of Vasa

Foreign
   Grand Officer of the Humane Order of African Redemption
   Commander of the Order of the Star of Ethiopia

References

External links
 

1905 births
1993 deaths
Swedish Air Force major generals
Swedish male modern pentathletes
Olympic modern pentathletes of Sweden
Modern pentathletes at the 1928 Summer Olympics
Military personnel from Stockholm
Commanders First Class of the Order of the Sword
Knights of the Order of Vasa
Recipients of orders, decorations, and medals of Ethiopia